Heather Mann (born ) is a British individual rhythmic gymnast representing England and Great Britain at international competitions. She competed at world championships, including at the 2005 World Rhythmic Gymnastics Championships where she finished in 3rd place. She represented England at the 2006 Commonwealth Games, finishing 9th in the individual all-around event.

See also 
 2005 World Rhythmic Gymnastics Championships

References

Further reading 
 1st LG Rhythmic Gymnastics International
 2006 Commonwealth Games Melbourne Australia 
 British Rhythmic Championships Overall Scores 
 Drop then a double

1989 births
Living people
British rhythmic gymnasts
Place of birth missing (living people)
Gymnasts at the 2006 Commonwealth Games
Commonwealth Games competitors for England
21st-century British women